Assignment (later known as Special Assignment) is a late night news magazine program of ABS-CBN. It was hosted by Teddy Locsin from August 3, 1995, to May 3, 2001 (as Assignment) and Luchi Cruz-Valdes from September 3, 2003 to July 2005 (as Special Assignment).

Hosts
 Assignment
Teddy Locsin, Jr. (1995–2001)
Tony Velasquez (2001)

 Special Assignment
Luchi Cruz-Valdes (2003–2005)

See also
List of Philippine television shows
List of programs broadcast by ABS-CBN

Philippine television news shows
1995 Philippine television series debuts
2001 Philippine television series endings
2003 Philippine television series debuts
2005 Philippine television series endings
1990s Philippine television series
ABS-CBN original programming
ABS-CBN News and Current Affairs shows
Filipino-language television shows
English-language television shows